The National Republican Alliance (ANR) is a minor Algerian political party led by ex-Prime Minister Redha Malek and founded on 5 May 1995. It is sometimes considered an offshoot of the older FLN. The ANR is strongly anti-Islamist, and denounced the 1995 Sant'Egidio accords, while later backing the referendum on national reconciliation. It received 208,379 votes in the elections of June 1997, but boycotted the 2002 elections, claiming they would be rigged.

2007 elections
In the May, 2007 elections, the ANR received 126,444 votes, or 2.21%. This gave them 4 seats in parliament.

Regional strength
In the Algerian legislative election, 2007, support for the ANR was higher than its national average (2.21%) in the following provinces:

Tissemsilt Province   8.72%
Mostaganem Province   7.63%
Béjaïa Province   5.24%
Blida Province   5.18%
Khenchela Province   5.00%
Ouargla Province   4.42%
Algiers Province   4.16%
Tipaza Province   3.98%
Illizi Province   3.84%
El Oued Province   3.83%
Saïda Province   3.20%
Béchar Province   3.18%
El Bayadh Province   2.93%
Jijel Province   2.76%
Tiaret Province   2.64%
Tlemcen Province   2.42%
Relizane Province   2.36%

References

External links
 National Republican Alliance website

1995 establishments in Algeria
Algerian nationalism
Nationalist parties in Algeria
Political parties established in 1995
Political parties in Algeria
Secularism in Algeria